Ernest Clarence Trevail "Clarrie" Heard  (8 June 1906 – 27 May 1990) was a New Zealand swimmer, who competed in the 200 m breaststroke at the 1924 Summer Olympics in Paris. Heard was eliminated in the heats with a time of 3:09.0. His best time before the Olympics was 3:02.2 which was the same as the fourth-placed finisher in the final but he, along with fellow swimmer Gwitha Shand, caught a cold before the Games and was not at his best.

References

1906 births
1990 deaths
Swimmers at the 1924 Summer Olympics
Olympic swimmers of New Zealand
Swimmers from Christchurch
20th-century New Zealand people